The Copa Chile 1993 was the 23rd edition of the Chilean Cup tournament. The competition started on February 20, 1993, and concluded on May 23, 1993. U. Española won the competition for their third time, beating Cobreloa 3-1 on the final. 
The points system used in the first round of the tournament was; 2 points for the winner but, if the winner team scores 4 or more goals, they won 3 points; in case of a tie, every team took 1 point but, no points for each team if the score were 0–0.

Calendar

Group Round

Group 1

Group 2

Group 3

Intergroup scores (groups 3-4)

Group 4

Group 5

Intergroup scores (groups 5-6)

Group 6

Second Group Round

Group 1

Group 2

Group 3

Group 4

Semifinals

Third place match

Final

Top goalscorer
Cristián Montecinos (D. Temuco) 15 goals

See also
 1993 Campeonato Nacional
 Primera B

References
Revista Don Balon (Santiago, Chile) February–May 1993 (revised scores & information)
RSSSF

Copa Chile
Chile
1993